Buguma City is a larger town in Rivers State, Nigeria. It is the headquarters of the Asari-Toru Local Government Area and base of the Kalabari Kingdom, a Nigerian traditional state.

The town has an official Post Office and a big set of commercial fish ponds set up by the State Government. The Current Mayor, popularly addressed as Chairman, of the LGA, which Buguma City is the headquarters, is Hon. (Amb) Onengiyeofori George (Starboy).

It is also home to the great King Amachree of the Kalabari kingdom.

In 1983, Buguma was designated a city by the Government of Melford Okilo and that status subsists to date.

Notable people

Hilda Dokubo
Taribo West
Tam David-West
Rex Lawson

References

Towns in Rivers State